was an entrepreneur, politician and cabinet minister in the pre-war Empire of Japan. He was the father of prominent post-war politician Yoshio Sakurauchi, and grandfather of controversial politician Seiichi Ota.

Life 
Sakurauchi was born in former Hirose Town Shimane Prefecture, in what is now part of the city of Yasugi, Shimane. The Sakurauchi family were former samurai in the service of Matsue Domain. His father relocated to Yonago in neighboring Tottori Prefecture in 1885, and started a company to produce and sell Water wheels. The venture did not succeed, and the family moved to Sakaiminato starting a business in commodity trading in 1886, followed by tofu production and retail sales in 1887.

Sakurauchi left home in 1893 to work in a paper mill in Yokohama in 1893 for minimal wages. In 1895, he was in Tokyo, working as a typesetter and artisan for a newspaper, becoming a reporter for the Nippon Telegraph news agency in 1902, and executive director of the Ogura Racing Association by 1907. Making a fortune in speculating in horses by 1908, he was appointed president of Saitama Electric Light Company in 1909 and president of Okayama Hydroelectric Company in 1917.

Sakurauchi was elected to the Lower House of the Diet of Japan in the 1920 General Election, under the Rikken Seiyūkai banner, and was reelected for six terms. Sakurauchi became president of Ibiden company in 1925. He subsequently changed his political party affiliation to the Rikken Minseitō, and  served as Secretary-General of the party in 1927.

In 1931, Prime Minister Wakatsuki Reijirō picked Sakurauchi as Minister of Commerce and Industry.  He returned to the Cabinet under the Hirota administration as Minister of Agriculture and Forestry in 1939.  In 1940, Sakurauchi was asked to serve as Treasury Minister under the Yonai administration.  As with all other Japanese politicians, Sakurauchi was forced to join the Taisei Yokusankai created by Prime Minister Fumimaro Konoe.  From May 1945 to April 1946, Sakurauchi served as a member of the Privy Council.

After the surrender of Japan, Sakurauchi was purged from public office in 1946 along with all other members of the wartime administration.  He died the following year.

 
|-

|-

1888 births
1946 deaths
People from Shimane Prefecture
Ministers of Finance of Japan
Government ministers of Japan
Rikken Seiyūkai politicians
Imperial Rule Assistance Association politicians
Rikken Minseitō politicians
Members of the House of Representatives (Empire of Japan)